Miroslav Stanić (Serbian Cyrillic: Мирослав Станић; born 11 December 1993) is a Serbian football midfielder who most recently played for Pobeda.

Career

FC DAC 1904 Dunajská Streda
He made his professional debut for FC DAC 1904 Dunajská Streda against FC ViOn Zlaté Moravce on 13 September 2014.

References

External links
 
 Futbalnet profile
 Eurofotbal profile

1993 births
Living people
Serbian footballers
Association football midfielders
FC DAC 1904 Dunajská Streda players
Slovak Super Liga players
Expatriate footballers in Slovakia
Sportspeople from Smederevo